Fuentes de Oñoro is a village and municipality in the province of Salamanca, western Spain, part of the autonomous community of Castile-Leon. It was the site of a significant battle in 1811, during the Peninsular War.

It is a border town, and is directly connected to the most important Portuguese terrestrial border of Vilar Formoso.

Geography

See also
Battle of Fuentes de Oñoro
List of municipalities in Salamanca

References

Municipalities in the Province of Salamanca
Portugal–Spain border crossings